Stone Smartt (born October 4, 1998) is an American football tight end for the Los Angeles Chargers of the National Football League (NFL). He played college football at Old Dominion.

Early years 
Smartt attended Del Oro High School in Loomis, California. During his high school career, he played the quarterback position, throwing for 3,021 yards from scrimmage with 29 touchdowns. He committed to Northern Arizona University to play college football in 2017.

College career 
As a true freshman at NAU in 2017, Smartt played in just 2 games. He transferred to Riverside City in 2018, where he played in 12 games and completed 177 out of 277 for 2,754 yards and 31 touchdowns. He won the NJCAA Athletic Bureau Offensive Player of the Year. In 2019, he transferred to Old Dominion. He made the move from quarterback to wide receiver in 2021.

Professional career 

He signed with the Chargers after going undrafted in the 2022 NFL Draft.

References

External links 

 Los Angeles Chargers bio
 Old Dominion Monarchs bio

1998 births
Living people
Players of American football from Sacramento, California
Sportspeople from Sacramento, California
American football tight ends
Old Dominion Monarchs football players
African-American players of American football
21st-century African-American sportspeople
Los Angeles Chargers players
American football quarterbacks
Riverside City Tigers football players
Northern Arizona Lumberjacks football players